Capacities of wine casks were formerly measured and standardised according to a specific system of English units.  The various units were historically defined in terms of the wine gallon so varied according to the definition of the gallon until the adoption of the Queen Anne wine gallon in 1707. In the United Kingdom and its colonies the units were redefined with the introduction of the imperial system whilst the Queen Anne wine gallon was adopted as the standard US liquid gallon.

The major wine producing countries use barrels extensively and have developed standards at variance with the traditional English volumes that are commonly used in the wine and wine cooperage industries.

Casks

Tun

The tun is an English unit of liquid volume (not weight), used for measuring wine, oil or honey. It is typically a large vat or vessel, most often holding 252 wine gallons, but occasionally other sizes (e.g. 256, 240 and 208 gallons) were also used.

Pipe or butt
The butt (from the medieval French and Italian botte) or pipe was half a tun, or 1008 pints (126 gallons). Tradition has it that George, Duke of Clarence, the brother of Edward IV of England, was drowned in a butt of malmsey on 18 February 1478. (However, Josephine Tey in The Daughter of Time suggests that "drowned in a butt of malmsey" means rather that George, Duke of Clarence, drank himself to death rather than literally drowning in a container of wine.) In Edgar Allan Poe's short story "The Cask of Amontillado", the narrator claims he has received "a pipe of what passes for Amontillado". In Edward Bulwer-Lytton's novel "Paul Clifford", Lord Mauleverer states to Lawyer William Brandon "Because he sent me, in the handsomest manner possible, a pipe of that wonderful Madeira, which you know I consider the chief grace of my cellars, and he gave up a canal navigation bill, which would have enriched his whole county, when he knew that it would injure my property."

Puncheon or tertian

The puncheon was a third of a tun. The term puncheon, shortened to pon in the United States, is thought to derive from the fact that it would have been marked by use of a punch to denote its contents. The unit was also known as a tertian (from the Latin word for "third").

Hogshead

Of comparable size to the beer hogshead, the wine hogshead was equal to half a butt or a quarter of a tun.

Tierce

Closely related to the modern oil barrel, the tierce was half a puncheon, a third of a butt or a sixth of a tun.

Barrel

The wine barrel was half a wine hogshead or an eighth of a tun.

Rundlet

The rundlet was a seventh of a butt or a fourteenth of a tun.

History
Originally, the tun was defined as 256 wine gallons. (This was the basis for calling 64 gallons a quarter.) At some time before the 15th century, it was reduced to 252 gallons, so as to be evenly divisible by other small integers, including seven. Note that a 252-gallon tun of wine has a mass of approximately 2060 pounds, between a short ton (2000 pounds) and a long ton (2240 pounds).

The tun is approximately the volume of a cylinder with both diameter and height of 42 inches, as the gallon was originally a cylinder with diameter of 7 inches and height of 6.
The Queen Anne wine gallon of 231 cubic inches was adopted in 1707 and still serves as the definition of the US gallon. A US tun is then the volume or of a rectangular cuboid with dimensions 36 by 38.5 by 42 inches.

When the imperial system was introduced the tun was redefined in the UK and colonies as 210 imperial gallons. The imperial tun remained evenly divisible by small integers. There was also little change in the actual value of the tun.

See also

 Barrel
 Barrel (unit)
 Cubic ton
 English brewery cask units
 List of unusual units of measurement
 Tonnage
 Units of measurement

Notes

References

British wine
Units of volume
Wine terminology
Wine packaging and storage